Freire de Andrade may refer to:

Bernardim Freire de Andrade (1759–1809), Portuguese Army general officer who was lynched by his own troops during the Peninsular War
Gomes Freire de Andrade, Portuguese cavalry captain and one of the Forty Conspirators
Gomes Freire de Andrade (1757–1817), Portuguese general officer who served in the Portuguese Legion (Legião Portuguesa) in Russia
Manuel Freire de Andrade (c. 1767–1834), Spanish cavalry officer and general during the Peninsular War

See also
Freire
Andrade (disambiguation)